Lafata is a surname. Notable people with the surname include:

David Lafata (born 1981), Czech footballer
Joe Lafata (1921–2004), American baseball player

See also
Lafita